Glasgow Cross was a railway station in the city centre of Glasgow.

History
This station was opened on 1 November 1895 by the Glasgow Central Railway.

It was closed, with the line through Glasgow Central (Low Level), on 5 October 1964.

Argyle Line

When the Argyle Line was opened in 1979, Glasgow Cross station was not reopened, being replaced by the new Argyle Street station to the west. Today it is now a ghost station and at surface level the only evidence of its existence are decorative ventilation grilles on the traffic island, between Trongate and London Road, whilst at track level there is a widening of the formation.

There have been proposals of the station being re-opened as an interchange as part of Crossrail Glasgow, which includes proposals for a new Glasgow Cross station located on the City Union bridge, tucked behind the Mercat Building.

References

Notes

Sources
 
 
 Two pictures: One at street level; the other a platform level

Disused railway stations in Glasgow
Railway stations in Great Britain opened in 1895
Railway stations in Great Britain closed in 1964
Former Caledonian Railway stations
Beeching closures in Scotland